The Scandinavian defence union was a failed plan to establish a military alliance between Sweden, Norway, Finland and Denmark after the end of World War II. Finland had fought two wars against the Soviet Union, Denmark and Norway had been occupied by Germany between 1940 and 1945, and Sweden, having been a neutral state throughout the war, had still felt the effects on either side. The four governments agreed that integration in the area of defence was needed, but an arrangements and the nature of a defence union did not materialize when Denmark, Iceland and Norway joined NATO in 1949, while Finland and Sweden did not.

In the 2000s, military cooperation between the Nordic nations increased, especially through Nordefco. It has generally not been regarded as a mutual defense union, but since the 2010s an increasing number of defense agreements were implemented. In 2022, Finland and Sweden requested to join NATO. The governments of the three Nordic NATO members released statements saying that they would use all necessary means in the defense of Finland and Sweden if they were attacked before they became members.

National positions and chosen strategies

Finland 
Finland had fought two wars, the Winter War and the Continuation War, against the Soviet Union; and also one minor war, the Lapland War, against Nazi Germany. Before these wars Finland had close relations with the Scandinavian countries. After the Continuation War where the Soviet Union forced Finland to sue for peace, but failed in its goal of conquering and annexing the country (in a manner similar to the Baltic States), Finland became neutral and retained a democratic government and a market economy. However, as the country shared 1,300 kilometres of border with the USSR, the position of the Soviet Union could not be ignored in Finnish politics. Regarding the Finnish membership in the Scandinavian defence union, far reaching discussions at state-level were made with the other candidate countries. These discussions were abruptly ended, when Sweden made a specific requirement, that approval from the Soviet Union must be received if Finland was to join. The Soviet answer was bluntly negative and Finland stayed neutral. In 1948, Finland had signed the Agreement of Friendship, Cooperation, and Mutual Assistance  with the Soviet Union, and according to the Soviet point of view, this agreement prohibited Finland's membership in any alliances that it could consider being of military nature, even in those created for defensive reasons.

Denmark and Iceland 
Both Denmark and Iceland showed a clear preference for joining the Scandinavian Defence Union over NATO. According to a 2018 literature review, the reasons why Danes preferred a Scandinavian military alliance over a North-Atlantic one were "ideology (pan-Scandinavianism), the domestic political situation, a strong belief in Swedish military power, and, especially given the different policies of the three Nordic countries, various lessons drawn from the Second World War."

Norway and Denmark 
The proposed union was discussed by a joint Scandinavian committee during the winter of 1948-1949, but the Cold War tensions between the United States and the Soviet Union, and preparations for a western alliance that would result in the North Atlantic Treaty proved that the efforts were in vain. When it became known that the western alliance would not be able to supply the Scandinavian countries with armaments before meeting their own pressing needs, this issue ultimately proved to be the turning point for Norway, which resigned from the talks. Denmark was still willing to enter into an alliance with Sweden, but the Swedes saw few advantages in this and the proposal failed. Norway and Denmark subsequently became signatory parties of the North Atlantic Treaty and members of NATO.

Sweden 
Sweden chose not to join NATO, despite a fierce debate on the issue. One of the strongest proponents was Herbert Tingsten, editor-in-chief of Dagens Nyheter, the largest newspaper in Sweden, who used editorials to argue why Sweden should join. He found a great opponent in the foreign minister of the time Östen Undén, who argued that Sweden should stay non-aligned and remain neutral in case of war. The position of Sweden as a member of the western world was not in doubt, but it could not, based on the choices it had made on foreign policy, join the western military alliance.

Later developments

Nordic Battlegroup 

Whilst not a defence union, the Nordic Battlegroup is a multi-national military unit. It is one of eighteen European Union Battlegroups that support European Union defence and security objectives. It consists of around 2,500 troops from Sweden, Finland, Norway, Ireland, Estonia, Latvia and Lithuania.

Nordic Defence Cooperation

The Nordic Defence Cooperation (Nordefco) is an ad-hoc collaboration established between the Nordic countries in 2009 for finding common solutions, strengthening the national defences and increasing cooperation between them. It has not generally been seen as a mutual defense pact and it is not regarded as a command structure, but its members have increasingly added features that show some resemblance to a defense pact. In 2021, the defense ministers of Denmark, Norway and Sweden signed an agreement of increased cooperation among their militaries with a coordination structure that would make it easier to "act together in peace, crisis or conflict" in the southern Nordic region, and in 2022 it was agreed to further enhance the capabilities by allowing access to each other's airspace and military infrastructure. A similar agreement for the northern Nordic region already existed between Finland, Norway and Sweden, which was further updated in 2022. Following Finland's and Sweden's request to join NATO, Denmark, Iceland and Norway released a statement saying that in the case of an attack on Finland or Sweden before they had become part of NATO, all necessary means would be used to help in their defense.

See also
Military of Denmark
Military of Finland
Military of Norway
Military of Sweden
Scandinavism
Swedish neutrality

References

Defence union
Nordic politics
1948 in Denmark
1948 in Norway
1948 in Sweden
1948 in Finland
Military history of Denmark
Military history of Norway
Military history of Sweden
Military history of Finland
1948 in international relations